Enyalioides is a genus of lizards in the family Hoplocercidae. The genus is native to the northern part of South America and Panama.

They are also referred to as woodlizards, although individual species are also called dwarf iguanas.

Species
The following 16 species are recognized as being valid.

Nota bene: A binomial authority in parentheses indicates that the species was originally described in a genus other than Enyalioides.

References

Further reading
Boulenger GA (1885). Catalogue of the Lizards in the British Museum (Natural History). Second Edition. Volume II. Iguanidæ ... London: Trustees of the British Museum (Natural History). (Taylor and Francis, printers).  xiii + 497 pp. + Plates I-XXIV. (Enyaliodes, new genus, p. 112).

Enyalioides
Lizard genera
Taxa named by George Albert Boulenger